is an underground railway station on the Tokyo Metro Chiyoda Line in Chiyoda, Tokyo, Japan, operated by Tokyo Metro. It is the closest station to Nijubashi Bridge and the Tokyo Imperial Palace. Tokyo Station is also within walking distance to/from this station - a passageway containing the Gyoko-dori Underground Gallery links the two stations underground.

Lines
The station is served by the Tokyo Metro Chiyoda Line, and is numbered C-10.

The Toei Mita Line passes close by, but does not serve this station.

Station layout

History
Nijubashimae station opened on March 20, 1971.

The station facilities were inherited by Tokyo Metro after the privatization of the Teito Rapid Transit Authority (TRTA) in 2004.

Surrounding area
 Tokyo Station
 Nijubashi
 Tokyo Imperial Palace

References

External links
 https://www.tokyometro.jp/lang_en/station/nijubashimae/index.html

Railway stations in Japan opened in 1971
Tokyo Metro Chiyoda Line
Stations of Tokyo Metro
Railway stations in Tokyo
Marunouchi
Buildings and structures in Chiyoda, Tokyo